This is a list of genetic algorithm (GA) applications.

Natural Sciences, Mathematics and Computer Science
 Bayesian inference links to particle methods in Bayesian statistics and hidden Markov chain models
 Artificial creativity
 Chemical kinetics (gas and solid phases)
 Calculation of bound states and local-density approximations
 Code-breaking, using the GA to search large solution spaces of ciphers for the one correct decryption.
 Computer architecture: using GA to find out weak links in approximate computing such as lookahead.
 Configuration applications, particularly physics applications of optimal molecule configurations for particular systems like C60 (buckyballs)
 Construction of facial composites of suspects by eyewitnesses in forensic science.
 Data Center/Server Farm.
 Distributed computer network topologies
 Electronic circuit design, known as evolvable hardware
 Feature selection for Machine Learning
 Feynman-Kac models 
 File allocation for a distributed system
 Filtering and signal processing 
 Finding hardware bugs.
 Game theory equilibrium resolution
 Genetic Algorithm for Rule Set Production
 Scheduling applications, including job-shop scheduling and scheduling in printed circuit board assembly. The objective being to schedule jobs in a sequence-dependent or non-sequence-dependent setup environment in order to maximize the volume of production while minimizing penalties such as tardiness. Satellite communication scheduling for the NASA Deep Space Network was shown to benefit from genetic algorithms.
 Learning robot behavior using genetic algorithms
 Image processing: Dense pixel matching
 Learning fuzzy rule base using genetic algorithms
 Molecular structure optimization (chemistry)
 Optimisation of data compression systems, for example using wavelets.
 Power electronics design.
 Traveling salesman problem and its applications

Earth Sciences
 Climatology: Estimation of heat flux between the atmosphere and sea ice
 Climatology: Modelling global temperature changes
 Design of water resource systems 
 Groundwater monitoring networks

Finance and Economics
 Financial mathematics
 Real options valuation
 Portfolio optimization
 Genetic algorithm in economics
 Representing rational agents in economic models such as the cobweb model
 the same, in Agent-based computational economics generally, and in artificial financial markets

Social Sciences
Design of anti-terrorism systems 
 Linguistic analysis, including grammar induction and other aspects of Natural language processing (NLP) such as word-sense disambiguation.

Industry, Management and Engineering
 Audio watermark insertion/detection
 Airlines revenue management
 Automated design of mechatronic systems using bond graphs and genetic programming (NSF)
 Automated design of industrial equipment using catalogs of exemplar lever patterns
 Automated design, including research on composite material design and multi-objective design of automotive components for crashworthiness, weight savings, and other characteristics
 Automated planning of structural inspection
 Container loading optimization
 Control engineering,
 Marketing mix analysis
 Mechanical engineering
 Mobile communications infrastructure optimization.
 Plant floor layout
 Pop music record production
 Quality control
Sorting network
 Timetabling problems, such as designing a non-conflicting class timetable for a large university
 Vehicle routing problem  
 Optimal bearing placement 
 Computer-automated design

Biological Sciences and Bioinformatics
 Bioinformatics Multiple Sequence Alignment
 Bioinformatics: RNA structure prediction
 Bioinformatics: Motif Discovery
 Biology and computational chemistry
 Building phylogenetic trees.
 Gene expression profiling analysis.
 Medicine: Clinical decision support in ophthalmology and oncology
 Computational Neuroscience: finding values for the maximal conductances of ion channels in biophysically detailed neuron models
 Protein folding and protein/ligand docking
 Selection of optimal mathematical model to describe biological systems
 Operon prediction.

General Applications
 Neural Networks; particularly recurrent neural networks
 Training artificial neural networks when pre-classified training examples are not readily obtainable (neuroevolution)

Physics
 Optimization of beam dynamics in accelerator physics.
 Design of particle accelerator beamlines

Other Applications
 Clustering, using genetic algorithms to optimize a wide range of different fit-functions.
 Multidimensional systems
 Multimodal Optimization 
 Multiple criteria production scheduling
 Multiple population topologies and interchange methodologies
 Mutation testing
 Parallelization of GAs/GPs including use of hierarchical decomposition of problem domains and design spaces nesting of irregular shapes using feature matching and GAs.
 Rare event analysis 
 Solving the machine-component grouping problem required for cellular manufacturing systems
 Stochastic optimization 
 Tactical asset allocation and international equity strategies
 Wireless sensor/ad-hoc networks.

References

Mathematics-related lists
Applications